The Ecuador National Museum of Medicine is located in Quito, Ecuador.

Mission 
Dr. Eduardo Estrella founded Ecuador's National Museum of Medicine on 5 March 1982. Estrella's mission was to paint a full picture of the native, natural medicine of South America and to preserve Ecuadoran heritage. The main elements of the museum include Aboriginal Medical Food, nutrition and health, medical archeology, and medicinal plants. There is a full museum with Dential equipment from the late 17th, 18th through the very start 19th century such as Antique Microscopes, Antique Medicine Bottles, medical instrument literature and a complete library of knowledge and language of Andian Medicine Plants.

There are also sections dedicated to Colonial medicine in South America, as well as institutionalization of academic medicine, hospitals, and medical education.

Dr. Eduardo Estrella studied medicine at the Central University of Ecuador. After graduation, Dr Estrella did his Postgraduate education on Radiotherapy at Massachusetts Institute of Technology in Cambridge, Massachusetts, United States from 1968 to 1970. He did his specialized studies in psychiatry at the University of Navarra, Pamplona from 1970 to 1973, Spain. Aguirre later chaired the medical faculty at the Central University of Ecuador.  Dr Estrella got his doctoral degree from the Catholic University of Quito in the 1980s. This was after he had published extensively on Andian medicine and on the history of medicine.

Archives

The Dr. Eduardo Estrella National Museum of Medicine library has been established to collect, protect, classify and catalog the medical, administrative and economic documentation of health institutions for Ecuador.  The library is composed of more than 15 documentaries funds, corresponding to approximately 10,000 boxes and hardcover volumes.  The Museum and Library are located in Hall No. 5 Eugenio Espejo Convention Center (lanes Sodiro and Valparaiso). Open Monday to Saturday from 8:30 to 3:00 pm.

See also
Quito#Museums

References

 historiadelamedicina.org Ecuador National Museum of Medicine
 www.terraecuador.net
 ecuador.com Museo Nacional de Medicina del Ecuador

External links 
 Museums in Ecuador
 www.intramed.net
 www.revistapersona, burgos page
 Google Maps - Dr. Eduardo Estrella Museum of Medicine in Quito, Ecuador
elcomercio.com Ecuador National Museum of Medicine      

Museums in Quito
Education in Quito
Medical museums
Herbalism organizations
Medical and health organisations based in Ecuador